Çağlarca may refer to:

 Çağlarca, Konyaaltı, village in Antalya Province, Turkey
 Çağlarca, Toroslar, village in Mersin Province, Turkey